The canton of Saint-Quentin-Centre is a former administrative division in northern France. It was disbanded following the French canton reorganisation which came into effect in March 2015. It had 19,418 inhabitants (2012). The canton comprised part of the commune of Saint-Quentin.

Demographics

See also
Cantons of the Aisne department

References

Former cantons of Aisne
2015 disestablishments in France
States and territories disestablished in 2015